160th Division may refer to:

160th Division (Imperial Japanese Army)
160th Division (People's Republic of China)
160th Infantry Division (Wehrmacht)

Military units and formations disambiguation pages